Galikash, also Romanized as Galikesh) is a city and capital of Galikash County in Golestan Province, in northern Iran.  At the 2006 census, its population was 20,009, in 4,829 families.

References

Populated places in Galikash County

Cities in Golestan Province